Long Valley Finnish Church is a church constructed to meet the needs of Finnish immigrants to the United States, located in Valley County, Idaho. The church was added to the National Register or Historic Places on May 27, 1980.

The church was maintained by the Finnish Ladies' Aid Society.  It was "the best-preserved building of the Long Valley Finnish community".

References

External links
 Image of the church
 Idaho State Historical Society Reference Series Site Report - North Fork Payette-Long Valley

Churches in Idaho
Churches on the National Register of Historic Places in Idaho
Buildings and structures in Valley County, Idaho
Finnish-American culture in Idaho
National Register of Historic Places in Valley County, Idaho
1917 establishments in Idaho